United States gubernatorial elections were held in 1889, in eleven states.

Virginia holds its gubernatorial elections in odd numbered years, every 4 years, following the United States presidential election year. New Jersey at this time held gubernatorial elections every 3 years, which it abandoned in 1949. Massachusetts and Rhode Island both elected its governors to a single-year term, which they abandoned in 1920 and 1912, respectively. Iowa and Ohio at this time held gubernatorial elections in every odd numbered year.

Mississippi at this time held its gubernatorial elections in odd numbered years, every 4 years, following the United States presidential election year. This was the last election in which this was the case; Mississippi switched to four-year terms with elections in the year preceding the presidential election year starting with the 1895 elections.

Montana, North Dakota, South Dakota, and Washington held their first gubernatorial elections on achieving statehood. Each of these states held early elections on October 1, 1889.

Results

References

Notes

Bibliography 
 
 
 
 
 
 

 
November 1889 events